Wang Siyu (born 16 October 1995) is a Chinese basketball player. She represented China at the 2018 FIBA Women's Basketball World Cup.

References

External links

Living people
1995 births
Basketball players from Shandong
Chinese women's basketball players
Guards (basketball)
Bayi Kylin players
Asian Games medalists in basketball
Basketball players at the 2018 Asian Games
Asian Games gold medalists for China
Medalists at the 2018 Asian Games
People from Haiyang
Sportspeople from Yantai
Shandong Six Stars players
Basketball players at the 2020 Summer Olympics
Olympic basketball players of China